New Republic may refer to:

Places
 New Republic, California, former name of Santa Rita, Monterey County, California
 New Republic (Santarem), district in the city of Santarém, Pará

Countries
 New Republic (Brazil), the restored civilian government of Brazil since 1985
 New Republic (Portugal), 1917-1918, an era within the First Portuguese Republic
 New Republic (South Africa) (Afrikaans: Nieuwe Republiek, 1884–1888), a short-lived country in 1880s South Africa

Fictional locations
 New Republic (Star Wars), a fictional government from Star Wars
 New Republic (Singularity Sky), a fictional polity in the 2004 novel Singularity Sky by Charles Stross

Politics
 New Republic Party (Costa Rica)
 New Republic (Romania), a political party in Romania
 New Republic Party (South Africa), a defunct political party in South Africa
 Union for the New Republic (France), a political party
 Union for the New Republic (Gabon), a political party
 Union for the New Republic (Guinea), a political party
 Democratic Union for the New Republic (Italy), a political party

Literature
 The New Republic, an American politics and culture magazine
 The New Republic (novel), an 1878 satirical novel by William Hurrell Mallock
 The New Republic (newspaper), Chinese-language newspaper in Canada

See also

 
 
 New Republic Pictures, a film and television production company
 New Republican Party (Malawi)
 New Republican Society (Netherlands)
 New Republican Force (Bolivia), a political party
 La Nouvelle République (disambiguation), "New Republic" in French
 New Republic Party (disambiguation)
 New (disambiguation)
 Republic (disambiguation)